Buried Alive: The Elements of Love is a young adult book of poetry by Ralph Fletcher, with photographs by Andrew Moore.  It was first published in 1996.

Summary
This book is a collection thirty six free verse poems about teenage love divided into four elements: earth, water, air, and fire.

Reception
Marjorie Lewis in her review for School Library Journal said that "the poetry, the inviting pages, the metaphor of the arrangement, the romantic situations and the mysterious photo-collages is, in its complexity, a step above the works of Mel Glenn and Gary Soto.  Joan B. Elliott and Mary M. Dupuis recommended this book for use in the classroom in their book Young Adult Literature in the Classroom.

Notes

External links
Ralph Fletcher's website

1996 poetry books
American poetry collections
Young adult poetry books
Atheneum Books books